Campiglossa iracunda is a species of tephritid or fruit flies in the genus Campiglossa of the family Tephritidae.

Distribution
The species is found in India, Myanmar, Thailand, Vietnam.

References

Tephritinae
Insects described in 1938
Diptera of Asia